The 1963–64 National Hurling League was the 33rd season of the National Hurling League.

Division 1

Waterford came into the season as defending champions of the 1962-63 season.

On 31 May 1964, Tipperary won the title after a 4-16 to 6-6 aggregate win over New York in the final. It was their 11th league title overall and their first since 1960-61.

In spite of finishing at the bottom of their respective groups, neither Clare or Carlow were relegated.

Tipperary's Jimmy Doyle was the Division 1 top scorer with 8-35.

Group 1A table

Group stage

Group 1B table

Group stage

Knock-out stage

Semi-finals

Home final

Final

Top scorers

Top scorers in a single game

Division 2

On 3 May 1964, Westmeath won the title after a 3-9 to 3-7 win over Laois in the final.

In spite of finishing at the bottom of their respective groups, neither Down or Wicklow were relegated.

Group 2C table

Group 2D table

Knock-out stage

Semi-finals

Final

References

National Hurling League seasons
Lea
Lea